Caryville is a town in Washington County, Florida, United States located along the Choctawhatchee River. The population was 411 at the 2010 census.

Geography

Caryville is located at  (30.775620, –85.810506).

Demographics

As of the census of 2000, there were 218 people, 86 households, and 57 families residing in the town. The population density was 72.1 inhabitants per square mile (27.9/km2). The racial makeup of the town was 73.39% White, 20.64% African American, 1.38% Native American, 2.75% from other races, and 1.83% from two or more races. Hispanic or Latino of any race were 5.96% of the population.

There were 86 households, out of which 36.0% had children under the age of 18 living with them, 48.8% were married couples living together, 15.1% had a female householder with no husband present, and 32.6% were non-families. 26.7% of all households were made up of individuals, and 12.8% had someone living alone who was 65 years of age or older.  The average household size was 2.53 and the average family size was 3.16.

In the town, the population was spread out, with 32.1% under the age of 18, 6.4% from 18 to 24, 28.9% from 25 to 44, 19.3% from 45 to 64, and 13.3% who were 65 years of age or older.  The median age was 32 years. For every 100 females, there were 115.8 males.  For every 100 females age 18 and over, there were 97.3 males.

The median income for a household in the town was $22,500, and the median income for a family was $28,750. Males had a median income of $25,000 versus $15,625 for females. The per capita income for the town was $11,385.  About 16.7% of families and 37.3% of the population were below the poverty line, including 66.7% of those under the age of eighteen and 35.1% of those 65 or over.

History 
During July 1994, the Choctawhatchee River flooded and rose to a record level of 29 feet. The flooding submerged most of Caryville under water. Due to the 'buyout' of the Federal Emergency Management Agency (FEMA), many residents left. This departure left only about 200 residents in the town.

Caryville, in northwestern Washington County, owes its existence largely to the forestry products industries. An early sawmill town, Caryville's location was dictated by the presence  of the Choctawhatchee River, which was crossed in Caryville by the Pensacola and Atlantic Railroad in 1882 (Later to become L&N Railroad).

The most accepted matter of Caryville's name, and the one listed in Allen Morris, The Florida Handbook, is that the name came from R.M. Cary, who was secretary to the P. and A. Railroad Company. The area was originally called Half Moon Bluff. Some of the construction material for the new railroad was unloaded from steamships coming in from Pensacola at this location.

The railroad had hardly got started before some land sales were recorded in the vicinity. On February 24, 1882, Thomas Hannah of Point Washington sold several lots totaling 121 acres of Half Moon Bluff to Edwards, Brooks and Company of Opelika, Alabama. Two years latter, after the place had been named Caryville, W. L. Whitlick of Pensacola was operating what may have been the first sawmill in the community.

Some logging operation may have been in progress before the coming of the railroad. The logs were consigned to the river, bearing the name and brand of Strickland and Wesley of Point Washington. The brand was a circle caw bearing 12 teeth. The logs were floated down stream to the mouth of the Choctawhatchee where they were caught up in a boom and towed to nearby sawmills.

Big scale timber operations began with the establishment of Sanford Lumber Company at Caryville well before the end of the 19th century. By 1903 that lumber company was furnishing employment for about 400 "hands" and had capacity of 100,000 board feet of lumber per day. Electricity came to Caryville in 1903.

The holdings of Sanford Lumber Company were acquired by Henderson-Waits Lumber Company in 1912. Corporation officers were Glover G. Waits, president, Fred Henderson, vice president and Barney M Henderson, secretary- treasurer; Directors were Pox Henderson, James C. Waits and J. D. Henderson, Jr.

By 1925, Henderson-Waits had acquired about 125,000 acres of land, including a large acreage, bought from Foshee Lumber Company, which had announced plans to build a sawmill at Chipley.

At the height of the milling operation, logs were hauled in by steam locomotive with train tracks laid as far south as Ebro for this purpose.

The Henderson-Waits holdings including the Caryville mill, were sold late in 1925 to Brown-Florida Lumber Company, a branch of the W.P. Brown Lumber Company. The sale price was reported to be $3 million.

Brown-Florida, after halting operations in the early 1930s, reopened on a half-capacity in 1933, employing about 300 men. A few years later, the holdings were reacquired by Henderson-Waits Lumber Company who soon suspended operations due to exhaustion of virgin timber in the area.

Caryville was first incorporated in 1913, the same year R. E. L. McCaskill's first addition to Caryville was platted and recorded as a subdivision. G G. Blake, the L & N Station agent was the town's first mayor and John A. Roberts was the first town marshal. H. E. Brooks was city clerk. Councilmen were Dr. L. H. Paul, W. C. Daniels, Pitt C. Miller, T. A. Gaskin and F. J. Moore. Streets in the McCaskill subdivision ran east and west with the avenues extending north and south.

Streets listed were Liberty, Jefferson, Roosevelt, Washington, Lincoln, McKinley, Wilson, Cleveland and Monroe. Avenues were named Waits and Henderson, each named for the principal owners of the big lumber company. Charles, named for Judge L. L. Charles, Superintendent of Schools of Washington County from 1888 - 1893, long time teacher, district Justice of the Peace and community leader. Owens, obviously named for a Washington family by the name. Daniels, for W.C. Daniels. Alford, for W.C., J. R. and S. A. Alford, Sr, Chipley-Bonifay naval stores operators and business. Sessions, for K. P. and William A. Sessions, also naval store operators and businessmen. Lindsay, for Ben Lindsay, naval stores operator who became a. state senator for Walton and Holmes Counties.

Caryville was plagued with fires and floods in its early days. The most destructive flood came in March 1929.

Violence is also a part of Caryville's history. On July 1, 1934, Joe Brock and his son Fred were gunned down on a Saturday afternoon in the midst of a crowd gathered at the sawmill commissary, known as the Company Store.

The town continued to survive. It had its own school for 72 years. The L& N passenger train stopped in Caryville as did the Greyhound Bus. Western Union service was available, and the town had a drug store, a post office, numerous churches, two or more service stations and an automobile repair garage.

Si Locke, the town barber became Justice of the Peace and Harley Nelson was the Constable, with a new 1937 Ford as his police cruiser. Early Hodges store and Jenkins Grocery operated by Mel and Christine McKinnon Jenkins were the main businesses.

The end of the virgin timber harvest did not terminate the forest products industry for Caryville. W. F. Harrison operated a sawmill and E. A. Hodges and Fern Arnold formed a lumber company, which later became Arnold Lumber Company. It remained the community's largest industry as late as 1971. Howell Plywood Corporation operated a plant in Caryville for several years in the post World War II era. Operations were continued on a modest scale by the Harrison and Garner Lumber Company.

In 1954, residents of Caryville, realizing their town charter had lapsed, voted to remain unincorporated. Eleven years later, voters approved incorporation with a charter that withheld police and as valorem taxing powers.

Calvit L. Walker a retired Army officer, was elected mayor. C. C. Barlow was named city clerk members of the town council under the new charter were Franklin P. Evans, Herman Brown, Preston Anderson, Ernest Peters and Luther Whitaker, Gaston Bryan, Cleston Tadlock and Odell Parish were subsequently elected to the council.

A civic awakening was getting started in the town once again. A Wayside Park was added on the banks of the Choctawhatchee River, a totally new water system was installed and Caryville received a minimum custody vocational type prison facility at the south town limits.

Floods from the nearby river continued to take its toll on Caryville residents. A disastrous flooding in 1990, and again in 1994, caused many homes to be destroyed or badly damaged by the high water. In 1996. a massive buyout of homes in Caryville was initiated by FEMA with most of the home owners taking advantage of the offer to sell out and move to higher ground.

Today only a few houses dot the once thriving town of Caryville. City government is intact, however there are no schools or churches, and only a few businesses operate in the town.

Thus, the once booming sawmill town of Caryville has joined the other smaller municipalities of the area in slipping away into almost a total ghost town, leaving a rich heritage and history that will long live in the memory of those who remember the town's colorful past.

Notable people
Robert L. Carter, United States District Court judge and civil rights activist
Bob Thorpe, Major League Baseball player

References

Towns in Washington County, Florida
Towns in Florida